Lyell Avenue is a former Rochester Industrial and Rapid Transit Railway station located in Rochester, New York. The line had a connection to the New York Central Railroad. It was closed in 1956 along with the rest of the line. An OTB currently sits on the site of the station.

References

Railway stations in Rochester, New York
Railway stations in the United States opened in 1918
Railway stations closed in 1956
1918 establishments in New York (state)
1956 disestablishments in New York (state)